Albireo  is a double star designated Beta Cygni (β Cygni, abbreviated Beta Cyg, β Cyg). The International Astronomical Union uses the name "Albireo" specifically for the brightest star in the system. Although designated 'beta', it is fainter than Gamma Cygni, Delta Cygni, and Epsilon Cygni and is the fifth-brightest point of light in the constellation of Cygnus. Appearing to the naked eye to be a single star of magnitude 3, viewing through even a low-magnification telescope resolves it into its two components. The brighter yellow star, itself a very close binary system, makes a striking colour contrast with its fainter blue companion.

Nomenclature

β Cygni (Latinised to Beta Cygni) is the system's Bayer designation. The brighter of the two components is designated β¹ Cygni or Beta Cygni A and the fainter β² Cygni or Beta Cygni B.

The system's traditional name Albireo is a result of misunderstanding and mistranslation.  It is thought that it originated in the Greek name  for the constellation of Cygnus, which became  in Arabic. When translated into Latin, this name was thought to refer to the Greek name Erysimon for the plant called Hedge Mustard (Sisymbrium officinale, which in Latin is ireo), and so was described in Latin in the Arabo-Latin Almagest of 1515 as "Eurisim: et est volans; et jam vocatur gallina. et dicitur eurisim quasi redolens ut lilium ab ireo" ("Eurisim: and it is the flyer, and now it is called the hen, and it is called Eurisim, as if redolent like the lily from the 'ireo'"), via a confusion between ireo and the scented flower Iris florentina. This was variously miscopied, until "ab ireo" was treated as a miscopy of an Arabic term and changed into .

In 2016, the International Astronomical Union organized a Working Group on Star Names (WGSN) to catalog and standardize proper names for stars. The WGSN's first bulletin of July 2016 included a table of the first two batches of names approved by the WGSN; which included Albireo  for β¹ Cygni. It is now so entered in the IAU Catalog of Star Names.

Medieval Arabic-speaking astronomers called Beta Cygni  (English: the hen's beak). The term  (منقار الدجاجة) or Menchir al Dedjadjet appeared in the catalogue of stars in the Calendarium of Al Achsasi Al Mouakket, which was translated into Latin as Rostrum Gallinae, meaning the hen's beak.

Since Cygnus is the swan, and Beta Cygni is located at the head of the swan, it is sometimes called the "beak star".  With Deneb, Gamma Cygni (Sadr), Delta Cygni, and Epsilon Cygni (Gienah), it forms the asterism called the Northern Cross.

Properties

When viewed with the naked eye, Albireo appears to be a single star. However, in a telescope it resolves into a double star consisting of β Cygni A (amber, apparent magnitude 3.1), and β Cygni B (blue-green, apparent magnitude 5.1). Separated by 35 seconds of arc, the two components provide one of the best contrasting double stars in the sky due to their different colors.

It is not known whether the two components β Cygni A and B are orbiting around each other in a physical binary system, or if they are merely an optical double. If they are a physical binary, their orbital period is probably at least 100,000 years. Some experts, however, support the optical double argument, based on observations that suggest different proper motions for the components, which implies that they are unrelated. More recently the Gaia mission has measured distances of about 330–390 light years (100–120 parsecs) for both components, but noise in the astrometric measurements for the stars means that data from Gaia's second data release is not yet sufficient to determine whether the stars are physically associated.

In around 3.87 million years, Albireo will become the brightest star in the night sky. It will peak in brightness with an apparent magnitude of –0.53 in 4.61 million years.

There are a further 10 faint companions listed in the Washington Double Star catalogue, all fainter than magnitude 10. Only one is closer to the primary than Albireo B, with the others up to 142" away.

Albireo A
The spectrum of Beta Cygni A was found to be composite when it was observed as part of the Henry Draper Memorial project in the late 19th century, leading to the supposition that it was itself double. This was supported by observations from 1898 to 1918 which showed that it had a varying radial velocity. In 1923, the two components were identified in the Henry Draper Catalogue as HD 183912 and HD 183913.

In 1978, speckle interferometry observations using the 1.93m telescope at the Haute-Provence Observatory resolved a companion at 0.125". This observation was published in 1980, and the companion is referred to as component Ab in the Washington Double Star Catalog.

In 1976 speckle interferometry was used to resolve a companion using the 2.1-meter telescope at the Kitt Peak National Observatory. It was measured at a separation of 0.44", and it is noted that the observation was inconsistent with the Haute-Provence observations and hence not of the same star. Although these observations pre-dated those at Haute-Provence, they were not published until 1982 and this component is designated Ac in the Washington Double Star Catalog. It is designated as component C in the Catalog of Components of Double and Multiple Stars, not to be confused with component C in the Washington Double Star Catalog which is a faint optical companion. An orbit for the pair has since been computed using interferometric measurements, but as only approximately a quarter of the orbit has been observed, the orbital parameters must be regarded as preliminary.  The period of this orbit is 214 years.  The confirmed close pair are referred to as Aa and Ac in modern papers, with Ab being the unconfirmed third component.

The diameter of the primary K-type giant star has been measured using interferometry.

Albireo B
β Cygni B is a fast-rotating Be star, with an equatorial rotational velocity of at least 250 kilometers per second.  Its surface temperature has been spectroscopically estimated to be about 13,200 K.

β Cygni B has been reported to be a very close double, but the observations appear to have been incorrect.

Moving group
Analysis of Gaia Data Release 2 astrometry suggests that four fainter stars may form a moving group along with the brighter visible components.

Namesakes
Albireo (AK-90) was a United States Navy Crater-class cargo ship named after the star.

Notes

References

Further reading

External links

 
 A picture of Albireo by Stefan Seip
 Albireo at Pete Roberts' Fuzzy Blobs site
 About Cygnus, including more information about the origin of the name Albireo.

B-type main-sequence stars
Cygni, Beta
Be stars
Cygni, 06
Binary stars
Cygnus (constellation)
BD+27 3410
183912
095947
7417
K-type bright giants
Albireo
Triple stars